Roy Ernest Hay (born 12 August 1961) is an English singer, songwriter and musician. He is best known as the lead guitarist, keyboardist, and backing vocalist of the new wave band Culture Club. Hay, a trained pianist since the age of five, replaced founding member Johnny Suede in 1981. Some of Hay's musical influences were Stevie Wonder, The Isley Brothers and Led Zeppelin. Before his involvement with Culture Club, Hay was a hairdresser in his native Essex.

It was during Culture Club's beginnings that Hay met Alison Green.  The two married in 1982.

According to the "Culture Club" episode the VH-1 series Behind the Music, Hay assisted Boy George in giving up heroin. The singer suffered the painful withdrawal symptoms closely attended by Hay in his Essex home.

Following Culture Club, Hay formed another band, called This Way Up, with singer Robinson Reid. In 1987, they released three singles: "Tell Me Why", "If I Can't Have You" and "Louise". An album, Feeling Good About It, was released in some European countries and in Japan in 1987. Of those records, "Tell Me Why" charted, for one week at number 72 in the UK Singles Chart.

Hay moved to Los Angeles, U.S. in 1989 and from there wrote for and produced young artists and bands for Sony Music. He branched into commercial composing and sound design with his own company Haywired Music.

Hay found later success as a composer in Hollywood, California, working with fellow composer Hans Zimmer and composing the music for a series directed by Robert Altman, as well as the music for Cracker and for Stephen King's The Dead Zone. Hay reunited with the three original members of Culture Club in 1998 to record a new album. In a Rolling Stone interview, Hay described the years apart as a healing process.  "There was obviously a bit of a healing process that needed to happen between Jon [Moss] and George.  They hadn't really spoken to each other in quite a while".  The description of the tour was "Older and wiser...We've all been through some good and bad times since the band.  I think we've all grown up a bit".

Literature 
 International Who`s Who of Popular Music, Europa Publications Limited, London, p. 224,

Citations

External links 

 

1961 births
Living people
English new wave musicians
English rock guitarists
English rock keyboardists
English expatriates in the United States
Grammy Award winners
Culture Club members
People from Southend-on-Sea